Tripartite motif-containing protein 37 is an E3 ubiquitin ligase in humans that is encoded by the TRIM37 gene.

Function 

This gene encodes a member of the tripartite motif (TRIM) family, whose members are involved in diverse cellular functions such as developmental patterning and oncogenesis. The TRIM motif includes zinc-binding domains, a RING finger region, a B-box motif and a coiled-coil domain. The RING finger and B-box domains chelate zinc and might be involved in protein–protein and/or protein–nucleic acid interactions. The gene mutations are associated with mulibrey (muscle-liver-brain-eye) nanism, an autosomal recessive disorder that involves several tissues of mesodermal origin. Alternatively spliced transcript variants encoding the same protein have been identified. It is responsible for the mono-ubiquitination of histone H2A at lysine 119, a modification commonly associated with transcriptional repression.

Role in breast cancer 
The 17q23 chromosomal region in which the TRIM37 gene is located has been shown to be amplified in up to 40% of breast cancers. The TRIM37 protein is thought to play a role in breast cancer oncogenesis by ubiquitinating histone H2A in regions occupied by tumor-suppressing genes. This repression of tumor-suppressing genes increases the likelihood that a tumor will occur or that an existing tumor will be more aggressive.

Interactions 

TRIM37 has been shown to interact with PRC1. TRIM37 has also been shown to interact with PRC2 to alter its specificity, and when TRIM37 is overexpressed, there are many changes to gene expression that lead to silencing of tumor-suppressing genes. It has also been shown that TRIM37, PRC2, PRC1 work together to co-bind to target genes, resulting in their transcriptional repression. Knockdown of TRIM37 expression via RNA-interference has shown to result in H2A becoming de-ubiquitinated and the dissociation of PRC1 and PRC2 from target genes. These changes allow the target gene to become transcriptionally active.

See also 
Mulibrey nanism

References

Further reading

External links